Milne & Choyce was one of the first department stores in Auckland, New Zealand. The upmarket department store grew from a draper's and milliner's first acquired by Mary Jane and Charlotte Milne in 1867. In 1874 the store moved to larger premises on Queen Street, before the name of the store changed to Milne & Choyce in 1876 following Charlotte Milne's marriage to Henry Choyce.

History 
In 1867 Mary Jane and Charlotte Milne took over a drapery shop at 37 Wyndham Street, on the corner of Albert Street in Auckland, New Zealand.

In 1874 after becoming more popular, the store moved to a larger rented space in Cheapside House at the corner of Queen and Wellesley Street in central Auckland.

Henry Choyce took over his wife Charlotte's interest in the company in 1876, and the business was renamed Milne & Choyce.

In 1887, as New Zealand was entering a depression, the store hosted a spring fashion parade; one of the first in Auckland.

In 1901 the company was made public, and became Milne & Choyce Ltd. Henry Choyce was the managing director of the company.

The store moved again in 1908, this time to 131-141 Queen Street.

In 1923 the store had replaced the wooden premises it moved into in 1908 with a nine floor building (with seven storeys visible above ground) designed by Auckland-based architect Llewellyn Piper. Two floors were below street level, and it had six lifts, fire alarms and a private telephone exchange, they also had a workroom to produce their own in house labels.

In 1959, a store opened in Palmerston North in the old C M Ross Company department store building. The building had been built in 1928 and stayed as a Milne & Choyce store until 1966, when it was sold to D.I.C and turned into a D.I.C store. The building is currently used as the Palmerston North City Library.

In 1960, Milne & Choyce opened a branch store on Hurstmere Road in Takapuna.

In 1961, Milne & Choyce entered an agreement with fellow department stores Farmers and Woolworths to purchase a plot of land in New Lynn to develop a shopping centre. The centre opened on the 30th of October 1963 as LynnMall, New Zealand's first shopping centre. Ot was anchored by all three and is still in operation to this day.

In 1965 a store opened in Remuera on the corner of Remuera Rd and Garden Rd. It was their largest suburban store. The store featured a coffee bar with 'sweets and cakes' which overlooked Hobson Bay. It also featured a self service food hall. One floor showed on Remuera Road but the store was actually three floors with a basement for storage and a rooftop carpark which could fit 60 cars.

In 1973, Fletcher bought the store, fighting off other department store businesses George Court and Sons and Atlas-Majestic.

On February 28, 1975, the city centre store closed and was relocated to the new Downtown Shopping Centre. At this point, the brand name was changed from Milne & Choyce to Milnes.

In January 1976, the Haywrights department store chain took over all stores and rebranded them from Milnes to Haywrights.

In 1978 the store at LynnMall was sold to Rendells. The Remuera store was also sold.

The Downtown Shopping Centre flagship store closed in August 1979 as Haywrights left the North Island and retreated back to the South Island.

In 1987, the group who had bought the Remuera building when it was sold by Haywrights decided to bring the store back, and founded the Milnes Group. The store reopened as Milnes of Remuera. Previois departments like children's and baby wear, school uniforms, shoes, hardware and kitchenware were axed with the intention of improving other departments.

In the late 1990s Milnes of Remuera closed, ending the Milne & Choyce brand after over 100 years of operation.

References

Department stores of New Zealand
Companies based in Auckland
Auckland CBD
Retail companies established in 1867
New Zealand companies established in 1867
1994 disestablishments in New Zealand
Defunct retail companies of New Zealand